The Wilkinson Peaks, also known as Langnabbane, is a group of peaks in the Napier Mountains standing  southeast of Mount Griffiths and  northeast of Mount Elkins in Enderby Land.

Discovery and naming
The Wilkinson Peaks were mapped by Norwegian cartographers from aerial photos taken by the Lars Christensen Expedition of 1936–37 and were called Langnabbane (the long peaks). They were visited in 1961 by an ANARE (Australian National Antarctic Research Expeditions) sledge party and renamed by the Antarctic Names Committee of Australia (ANCA) for Brian Geoffrey Wilkinson, the assistant diesel mechanic at Mawson Station in 1961.

References

External links
 United States Geological Survey, Geographic Names Information System (GNIS)

Mountain ranges of Enderby Land